The 2008 Atlantic hurricane season was the most destructive Atlantic hurricane season since 2005, causing over 1,000 deaths and nearly $50 billion (2008 USD) in damage. The season ranked as the third costliest ever at the time, but has since fallen to ninth costliest. It was an above-average season, featuring sixteen named storms, eight of which became hurricanes, and five which further became major hurricanes. It officially started on June 1 and ended on November 30. These dates conventionally delimit the period of each year when most tropical cyclones form in the Atlantic basin. However, the formation of Tropical Storm Arthur caused the season to start one day early. It was the only year on record in which a major hurricane existed in every month from July through November in the North Atlantic. Bertha became the longest-lived July tropical cyclone on record for the basin, the first of several long-lived systems during 2008.

The season was devastating for Haiti, where nearly 800 people were killed by four consecutive tropical cyclones (Fay, Gustav, Hanna, and Ike), especially Hurricane Hanna, in August and September. These four storms caused about $1 billion in damage in Haiti alone. The precursor to Kyle and the outer rain bands of Paloma also impacted Haiti. Cuba also received extensive impacts from Gustav, Ike, and Paloma, with Gustav and Ike making landfall in the country at major hurricane intensity and Paloma being a Category 2 when striking the nation. More than $10 billion in damage and 8 deaths occurred there.

Ike was the most destructive storm of the season, as well as the strongest in terms of minimum barometric pressure, devastating Cuba as a major hurricane and later making landfall near Galveston, Texas, as a large high-end Category 2 hurricane. One very unusual feat was a streak of tropical cyclones affecting land, with all but one system impacting land in 2008. The unusual number of storms with impact led to one of the deadliest and destructive seasons in the history of the Atlantic basin, especially with Ike, as its overall damages made it the second-costliest Atlantic hurricane on record at the time, although it has since been surpassed by several hurricanes.

Seasonal forecasts

Noted hurricane experts Dr. Philip J. Klotzbach, Dr. William M. Gray, and their associates at Colorado State University (CSU) – as well as forecasters at National Oceanic and Atmospheric Administration (NOAA), Met Office (UKMO), Tropical Storm Risk (TSR), Weather Services International (WSI) – issued forecasts of hurricane activity prior to the start of the season.

Dr. Klotzbach's team (formerly led by Dr. Gray) defines the average number of storms per season (1950 to 2000) as 9.6 tropical storms, 5.9 hurricanes, and 2.3 major hurricanes (storms reaching at least Category 3 strength in the Saffir-Simpson Hurricane Scale). A normal season, as defined by NOAA, has 9 to 12 named storms, with 5 to 7 of those reaching hurricane strength, and 1 to 3 major hurricanes.

Pre-season forecasts
The first forecast for the 2008 hurricane season was released by CSU on December 7, 2007. In its report, the organization predicted 13 named storms, 7 hurricanes, 3 major hurricanes, and an annual Accumulated Cyclone Energy (ACE) index of 115 units. The odds of a major hurricane landfall in the Caribbean and along the United States were projected to be above average. ACE is, broadly speaking, a measure of the power of the hurricane multiplied by the length of time it existed, so storms that last a long time, as well as particularly strong hurricanes, have high ACEs. It is only calculated for full advisories on tropical systems at or exceeding , which is the threshold for tropical storm strength. The odds of a major hurricane landfall in the Caribbean and along the United States were projected to be above average in the CSU forecast.

Three days later, TSR—a public consortium consisting of experts on insurance, risk management, and seasonal climate forecasting at University College London—called for a very active season featuring 15.4 (±4.7) named storms, 8.3 (±3.0) hurricanes, 3.7 (±1.8) major hurricanes, and a cumulative ACE index of 149 (±66) units. Mirroring CSU, the group assigned high probabilities that the United States and Lesser Antilles landfalling ACE index would be above average. On January 3, 2008, WSI projected 14 named storms, 7 hurricanes, and 3 major hurricanes.

In April, CSU slightly raised their values owing to a favorable Atlantic sea surface temperature configuration during the preceding month, upping the projected numbers to 15 named storms, 8 hurricanes, and 4 major hurricanes. TSR, in contrast, slightly reduced their numbers on April 7 due to cooler projections for Atlantic Ocean temperatures compared to their December forecast. WSI on April 23 raised the expected number of hurricanes from 7 to 8 and major hurricanes from 3 to 4 while leaving the number of named storms unchanged.  On May 22, the NOAA's Climate Prediction Center announced their first seasonal outlook for the 2008 season, highlighting 65 percent odds of an above-normal season, 25 percent odds for a near-normal season, and 10 percent odds of a below-average season. A range of 12 to 16 named storms, 6 to 9 hurricanes, and 2 to 5 major hurricanes was provided, each with 60 to 70 percent probability. The CPC, alongside TSR and CSU, highlighted the ongoing multi-decadal period of enhanced Atlantic tropical cyclone activity, the ongoing La Niña in the Pacific, and warmer than average ocean temperatures across the eastern tropical Atlantic as the basis for their predictions.

Midseason outlooks
On June 3, CSU released an updated outlook for the season but left their values from April unchanged. Examining conditions in April and May, the organization compiled a list of hurricane seasons with similar conditions: 1951, 1961, 2000, and 2001. TSR slightly lowered their numbers in their June 5 update but continued to predict an above-average season. Meanwhile, on June 18, the UKMO released their seasonal forecast, assessing a 70 percent probability the number of tropical storms would fall between 10 and 20, with 15 tropical storms noted as the most likely value in 2008. No projections for the number of hurricanes, major hurricanes, or ACE were given. On July 2, WSI held firm to their April forecast; the organization was forced to slightly increase the number of named storms and hurricanes later that month. On July 4, TSR slightly raised their forecast. Following an active start to the season, CSU upped their predictions in an August 5 update, calling for 17 named storms, 9 hurricanes, 5 major hurricanes, and an ACE index of 175 units. TSR released their final outlook for the season that day, raising their values to 18.2 (±2.9) named storms, 9.7 (±1.7) hurricanes, 4.5 (±1.4) major hurricanes, and an ACE index of 191 (±42) units. On August 7, NOAA's CPC raised their probability of an above-average season from 65 percent to 85 percent. The final outlook yielded a 67 percent chance of 14 to 18 named storms, 7 to 10 hurricanes, and 3 to 6 major hurricanes. WSI, meanwhile, issued their final seasonal outlook on August 27, reaffirming their numbers from the previous month.

Seasonal summary

The 2008 hurricane season officially began on June 1, though Tropical Storm Arthur formed one day earlier. The season was above-average, featuring 16 named storms, 8 of which intensified into hurricanes, while 5 of the hurricanes reached major hurricane status. Despite a La Niña dissipating early in the summer months, atmospheric conditions remained favorable for tropical cyclogenesis, including abnormally low wind shear between 10°N and 20°N. Additionally, sea surface temperatures in the deep tropics and the Caribbean Sea were fifth warmest since 1950. The season saw the first occurrence of major hurricanes in the months of July through November. Four storms formed before the start of August, and the season also had the earliest known date for three storms to be active on the same day: Hurricane Bertha, and Tropical Storms Cristobal and Dolly were all active on July 20. This season was also one of only ten Atlantic hurricanes seasons on record to have a major hurricane form before August, as well as one of only seven Atlantic seasons to feature a major hurricane in November. The final tropical cyclone, Hurricane Paloma, degenerated into a remnant low-pressure area over Cuba on November 9, three weeks before the season officially ended on November 30.

The season was devastating for Haiti, where four consecutive tropical cyclones – Fay, Gustav, Hanna, and Ike – killed at least 793 people and caused roughly $1 billion in damage. Hurricane Ike was the most destructive storm of the season, as well as the strongest, devastating Cuba as a major hurricane and later making landfall near Galveston, Texas, at Category 2 (nearly Category 3) intensity. The cyclone caused a particularly devastating storm surge along the western Gulf Coast of the United States due to in part to its large size. Ike was the second-costliest hurricane in the Atlantic at the time, but has since dropped to sixth following Sandy, Harvey, Irma, and Maria. Hanna was the deadliest storm of the season, killing 533 people, mostly in Haiti. Gustav was another very destructive storm, causing up to $8.31 billion in damage to Haiti, Jamaica, the Cayman Islands, Cuba, and the United States. Dolly caused up to $1.6 billion in damage to south Texas and northeastern Mexico. Bertha was an early season Cape Verde-type hurricane that became the longest-lived July North Atlantic tropical cyclone on record, though it caused few deaths and only minor damage. The Atlantic basin tropical cyclones of 2008 collectively caused roughly $49.4 billion in damage and at least 1,074 fatalities. At the time, the season ranked as the third costliest on record, behind only 2004 and 2005. However, it has since fallen to eighth.

Other notable storms included Tropical Storm Fay, which became the first Atlantic tropical cyclone to make landfall in the same U.S. state on 4 occasions; Tropical Storm Marco, the smallest Atlantic tropical cyclone on record; Hurricane Omar, a powerful late-season major hurricane which caused moderate damage to the ABC islands, Puerto Rico, and the Virgin Islands in mid-October; and Hurricane Paloma, which became the third-strongest November hurricane in recorded history and caused about $454.4 million in damage to the Cayman Islands and Cuba. The only storm of the season to not reach tropical storm status, Tropical Depression Sixteen, contributed to a significant flooding event in Central America, with the cyclone itself directly blamed for at least nine deaths.

Overall, the season's activity was reflected with a total cumulative ACE rating of 146. This was well above the normal average, and nearly double the rating given to each of the two preceding seasons (792006; 742007).

Systems

Tropical Storm Arthur

In late May, a westward-moving tropical wave and the mid-level remnants of Tropical Storm Alma from the East Pacific combined over the northwestern Caribbean Sea. This led to the formation of Tropical Storm Arthur by 00:00 UTC on May 31. The cyclone reached its peak intensity with winds of  six hours after development, and it made landfall at 09:00 UTC on June 1 about halfway between Belize City, Belize, and Chetumal, Yucatán Peninsula, at that strength. Once inland, Arthur quickly lost organization and degenerated to a remnant area of low pressure around 00:00 UTC on June 2. It dissipated six hours later. Total damage was estimated at $78 million, and five deaths were recorded.

Hurricane Bertha

A well-defined tropical wave left Africa on July 1 and organized into a tropical depression by 06:00 UTC on July 3. Six hours later, it intensified into Tropical Storm Bertha, the easternmost tropical storm on record in the Atlantic during July. Steered on a west-northwest or northwest course, Bertha reached hurricane strength around 06:00 UTC on July 7. The cyclone then underwent a period of rapid intensification that brought it to its peak as a Category 3 hurricane with winds of  later that day. Structural changes and a more hostile environment caused the storm to fluctuate in intensity as it passed east of Bermuda. By July 19, however, the storm began to undergo extratropical transition, a process it completed by 12:00 UTC the next morning. The post-tropical storm continued northeast and merged with a larger extratropical low near Iceland on July 21. Lasting a duration of 17 days, Bertha became the longest-lived Atlantic tropical cyclone on record during the month of July.

Power lines were downed, cutting electricity to about 7,500 homes, and tree branches were snapped. Heavy rainfall, reaching  at L.F. Wade International Airport, flooded roadways. Meanwhile, Bertha produced large waves and rip currents along the U.S. East Coast, resulting in 3 deaths offshore New Jersey and 57 water rescues in Atlantic City alone. Fifty-five people were injured off the coast of Delaware while an additional four individuals were injured off North Carolina. At Wrightsville Beach in particular, officials estimated at least 60 water rescues over a 48-hour span. Over a seven-day period beginning on July 9, the storm contributed to 1,500 ocean rescues in Ocean City, Maryland.

Tropical Storm Cristobal

A trough of low pressure, the remnants of an old frontal boundary, extended along the East Coast of the United States on July 15. The trough extended into the Gulf of Mexico the following day and resulted in the development of a circulation that subsequently crossed Florida on July 17. Once in the Atlantic, the system became better organized and coalesced into a tropical depression around 00:00 UTC on July 19. It intensified into Tropical Storm Cristobal twelve hours later. After passing close to the Outer Banks of North Carolina, the storm continued northeast and reached peak winds of  early on July 21, when an eye feature was evident on microwave imagery. Progressively cooler waters began to weaken Cristobal the next day, and it was then absorbed by a large extratropical cyclone south of Newfoundland around 12:00 UTC on July 23.

Generally lesser rainfall totals occurred across the Southeastern United States, though record daily accumulations around  resulted in minor flooding in Wilmington, North Carolina. Basements were flooded and roads were washed out along the Atlantic coast of Nova Scotia.

Hurricane Dolly
 

A tropical wave emerged off Africa on July 11. As the wave moved west into the Caribbean, it produced gale-force winds and its satellite presentation resembled that of a tropical storm at times. On a northwest course, the cyclone failed to organize initially; however, a more conducive environment in the Gulf of Mexico allowed Dolly to attain hurricane strength by 00:00 UTC on July 23 and reach its peak as a Category 2 hurricane with winds of  twelve hours later. It made a second landfall on the Texas mainland at a slightly reduced strength two hours later. Once inland, Dolly weakened to a tropical storm early on July 24 and ultimately degenerated to a remnant low around 00:00 UTC on July 26. The remnant low turned north and crossed the Mexico–United States border before losing its identity over New Mexico early on July 27.

In its early stages, mudslides generated by heavy rainfall from the storm caused 21 deaths in Guatemala. As the storm progressed across the Yucatán Peninsula, it produced significant beach erosion in Cancún. Offshore, the body of a fisherman was recovered while three others were purported missing. Offshore the Florida Panhandle, one person drowned in rough surf. Some buildings of lesser construction were severely damaged as well. Extensive damage to trees and utility poles occurred throughout Cameron and Willacy counties. Six weak tornadoes or waterspouts were recorded, but generally minor damage was observed. Widespread heavy rainfall occurred throughout southern Texas, with a concentration of  near Harlingen; this rainfall caused severe inland flooding. In the city itself, downed power lines fell into floodwaters, electrocuting a man. Farther north in New Mexico, an estimated 350–500 structures were damaged, roads and bridges were washed out, and one man was swept away by the swollen Rio Ruidoso river. In nearby El Paso, Texas, homes and streets were flooded, and one indirect death occurred when a driver rolled over after hitting a puddle. Overall, Dolly caused at least $1.6 billion in damage, with $1.3 billion in the United States and $300 million in Mexico.

Tropical Storm Edouard

The depression moved westward and intensified into Tropical Storm Edouard on August 4. Edouard made landfall near the McFaddin and Texas Point National Wildlife Refuges at 12:00 UTC on August 5 at peak strength. The system quickly weakened once inland and was downgraded to a tropical depression early on August 6 before degenerating into a remnant low at 06:00 UTC that day. It continued to move northwestward across Texas and dissipated around 00:00 UTC on August 7.

Rough surf and rip currents led to the deaths of three men in Panama City Beach, Florida, a fourth man in Perdido Key, a fifth man at Orange Beach, Alabama, and a sixth man near the mouth of the Mississippi River. This contributed to minor inland flooding. In Texas, rainfall peaked at  near Baytown, leading to the inundation of dozens of homes. Several roadways, including a portion of Interstate 10, were closed across Chambers and Harris counties. Overall Edouard caused about $800,000 in damage, with about $350,000 in Louisiana and $450,000 in Texas.

Tropical Storm Fay

A tropical wave emerged from Africa on August 6 and moved swiftly across the Atlantic, developing into a tropical depression by 12:00 UTC on August 15 while near the northwestern tip of Puerto Rico. The depression intensified into Tropical Storm Fay as it struck the coastline of Haiti, and it maintained its status as a minimal tropical storm while progressing through the Cayman Trough and into south-central Cuba. Fay curved north and zigzagged across Florida, making a record four separate landfalls in the state. The first occurred near Key West on August 18 and the second just east of Cape Romano on August 19. The third landfall occurred near Flagler Beach on August 21 and the final southwest of Carrabelle on August 23. The cyclone weakened to a tropical depression in the Florida Panhandle on August 24 and moved northwest into Mississippi before making an abrupt turn to the northeast the following day. It merged with a frontal boundary and became extratropical around 06:00 UTC on August 27. The low was ultimately absorbed by a larger extratropical system over Kentucky early the next morning.

Throughout the Caribbean, Fay contributed to at least 16 deaths: 10 in Haiti, 5 in the Dominican Republic, and 1 in Jamaica. The combination of heavy rainfall and gusty winds resulted in over 2,400 homes being damaged across the Dominican Republic. Similar destruction was reported in Haiti, particularly on Gonâve Island. As Fay meandered across Florida, it produced widespread torrential rainfall there, with accumulations peaking at a record  in the city of Melbourne. While run-off ultimately helped replenish Lake Okeechobee and surrounding reservoirs, the immediate impact of the rain event was more destructive. Numerous trees were felled, and downed power lines cut electricity to tens of thousands of homes. Fay was a prolific tornado producer, with 81 confirmations across 5 states: 19 in Florida, 17 in Georgia, 16 in North Carolina, 15 in Alabama, and 14 in South Carolina. A majority were short-lived and weak. Overall, Fay caused seventeen deaths in the United States: fifteen in Florida, one in Georgia, and one in Alabama. Throughout all areas impacted, Fay caused about $560 million in damage.

Hurricane Gustav

A tropical wave departed Africa on August 13, coalescing into a tropical depression south of Puerto Rico by 00:00 UTC on August 25 and intensifying into Tropical Storm Gustav twelve hours later. With a small inner core, the system rapidly strengthened to a hurricane early on August 26 before striking the southwestern peninsula of Haiti later that day. Gustav weakened while traversing Haiti and Jamaica but quickly restrengthened over the northwestern Caribbean, reaching winds of  before making landfall on the Isle of Youth, and striking the mainland just east of Los Palacios, Cuba, with winds of  later on August 30. Gustav continued northwest, weakening to a tropical depression over northern Louisiana before merging with a cold front over northern Arkansas around 12:00 UTC on September 4. The remnants accelerated northeast and merged with another extratropical low over the Great Lakes later on September 5.

Throughout the Dominican Republic, over 1,239 homes were damaged, of which 12 were destroyed, and about 50 communities were isolated. Eight people were killed in a mudslide. In neighboring Haiti, some 10,250 homes were damaged, including about 2,100 that were destroyed. Eighty-five people were killed. The storm caused $210 million in damage across Jamaica and resulted in 15 deaths. The  wind gust, observed at Paso Real de San Diego weather station in Pinar del Río Province, was the second highest wind gust ever recorded on land in a tropical cyclone, behind only Cyclone Olivia's  gust on Barrow Island, Australia. Dozens of residents were injured but no deaths occurred. The estimated cost of the storm fell just shy of $2.1 billion. Upon striking the United States, Gustav produced strong winds that damaged the roofs and windows of many structures, as well as a large storm surge along the coastline of Louisiana which overtopped levees and floodwalls in New Orleans. Widespread heavy rainfall contributed to significant inland flooding from Louisiana into Arkansas. Tornadoes were confirmed throughout the region, including 21 in Mississippi, 11 in Louisiana, 6 in Florida, 2 in Arkansas, and 1 in Alabama. In total, Gustav cost $6 billion in the United States and killed 53 people: 48 in Louisiana, 4 in Florida, and 1 at sea.

Hurricane Hanna

Twelve hours later, the depression intensified into Tropical Storm Hanna. Interaction between the cyclone and an upper-level low kept Hanna fairly steady-state for several days, with its appearance briefly resembling that of a subtropical storm. Meanwhile, a building ridge over the eastern United States forced the storm to dive south. A reprieve in upper-level winds allowed Hanna to attain hurricane strength at 18:00 UTC on September 1 and reach peak winds of  six hours later. However, the aforementioned ridge soon began to impart northerly wind shear, and the cyclone weakened accordingly. It curved northeast once inland, merging with one cold front over southern New England and a second near Newfoundland.

Hanna produced heavy rainfall across mountainous sections of Puerto Rico, leading to mudslides that damaged bridges and roads. Strong winds downed trees and power lines. Damage across the Turks and Caicos Islands in the wake of the storm was presumed to have been minor—confined to some roof damage to homes—but damage assessments were limited given the impact of Hurricane Ike less than a week later. Across Hispaniola, torrential rainfall exacerbated flooding that had already occurred during Tropical Storm Fay and Hurricane Gustav. While the exact death toll is indiscernible due to the quick succession of tropical cyclones, Hanna is believed to have killed at least 529 people in Haiti, most in the commune of Gonaïves, as well as 1 person in the Dominican Republic. Along the coastline of the United States, rip currents killed one person at Kure Beach, North Carolina and another in Spring Lake, New Jersey. Gusty winds downed trees and power lines that cut electricity along the Eastern seaboard. Storm surge and heavy rainfall contributed to flooding, particularly in low-lying locales and across New Hampshire. One person drowned in a South Carolina drainage ditch. Total damage was estimated at $160 million.

Hurricane Ike

At 06:00 UTC on September 1, the season's ninth tropical depression developed from a well-defined tropical wave that left Africa on August 28. A strong subtropical ridge to the depression's north directed it on a west-northwest path for several days, while environmental conditions allowed for quick intensification. The ridge to Ike's north soon amplified, forcing the hurricane on an unusual, prolonged southwest track while also imparting increased wind shear. After briefly weakening below major hurricane strength, a relaxation in the upper-level winds allowed Ike to reattain Category 4 strength while entering the Turks and Caicos Islands; it then made several landfalls at a slightly reduced intensity. Land interaction prompted structural changes to the storm's core, and Ike only slowly rebounded to an intensity of  before its landfall on the northern end of Galveston Island, Texas, early on September 13. Ike curved northeast once inland, interacting with a front the next morning and merging with another low near the Saint Lawrence River on the afternoon of September 15.

In Haiti, Ike compounded the flooding disaster imparted by previous storms Fay, Gustav, and Hanna. The country's food supply, shelter, and transportation networks were ruined. At least 74 deaths were attributed to the hurricane in Haiti, and an additional 2 occurred in the Dominican Republic. In the Turks and Caicos Islands, about 95 percent of all houses on Grand Turk Island were damaged, 20 percent of which severely so. An equal proportion of homes were damaged in South Caicos, including over one-third that were significantly damaged or destroyed. The agricultural and fishing industries suffered significant losses too. The highest concentration of damage in the Bahamas occurred on Inagua, where 70–80 percent of houses sustained roof damage, of which approximately 25 percent saw major damage or were destroyed. Throughout both archipelagos, damage climbed to between $50–200 million. In Cuba, nearly a quarter of the island's population, 2.6 million people, was evacuated in advance of the storm; as a result, only seven deaths were reported. However, structural damage was catastrophic, with 511,259 homes damaged (about 61,202 of which were total losses). About 4,000 metric tons (4,410 st) of foodstuffs were ruined in storage facilities while the island's crops as a whole sustained serious damage. Floodwaters cut off several communities as roads were inundated and bridges were swept away. Ike was estimated to have caused about $7.3 billion in damage across Cuba, making it the costliest hurricane on record there until Hurricane Irma in 2017.

The storm's destruction was most complete on the Bolivar Peninsula, where nearly all homes were wiped off their foundations and demolished. Numerous trees and power lines were downed, cutting power to some 2.6 million customers across Texas and Louisiana. Roads were obstructed by both floodwaters and fallen objects. As Ike transitioned into an extratropical cyclone, it produced extensive wind damage across the Ohio River Valley. In Ohio alone, 2.6 million people lost power. Insured losses climbed to $1.1 billion, comparable to the Xenia tornado of the 1974 Super Outbreak in terms of being the costliest natural disaster in the history of Ohio. Throughout the United States, Ike killed 74 people in Texas, 28 people across the Ohio River Valley, 6 people in Louisiana, and 1 person in Arkansas. Damage reached $30 billion. Farther north in Canada, the remnants of Ike produced record rainfall and high winds across portions of Ontario and Québec.

Tropical Storm Josephine

A strong tropical wave accompanied by a surface low departed Africa late on August 31. The system began to organize almost immediately after entering the Atlantic, developing into a tropical depression around 00:00 UTC on September 2 and intensifying into Tropical Storm Josephine six hours later. On a west to west-northwest heading, the cyclone steadily intensified and attained peak winds of  early on September 3. An exceptionally strong upper-level trough, aided by outflow from nearby Hurricane Ike, prompted a weakening trend thereafter. Despite intermittent bursts of convection, Josephine weakened to a tropical depression around 00:00 UTC on September 6 and degenerated to a remnant low six hours later. The low ultimately dissipated on September 10. The storm's remnants impacted Saint Croix early on September 12, producing localized heavy rainfall that flooded roadways.

Hurricane Kyle

A tropical wave moved off the west coast of Africa on September 12. The westward-moving feature crossed the Windward Islands on September 19 and began to interact with a strong upper-level trough, leading to an increase in convection and a more evident circulation center. Steering currents directed the disturbance into the southwest Atlantic, where a decrease in wind shear led to the formation of a tropical depression by 00:00 UTC on September 25 and organization into Tropical Storm Kyle six hours later. Gradual intensification occurred as the cyclone passed well west of Bermuda; it attained hurricane strength around 12:00 UTC on September 27 and reached peak winds of  a day later. After making landfall just north of Yarmouth, Nova Scotia, at 00:00 UTC on September 29, Kyle accelerated northeastward. The storm developed a frontal structure as convection became elongated and asymmetric, leading to its extratropical transition by 06:00 UTC on September 29. A larger extratropical low absorbed it about a day later.

About $48 million in damage occurred in Puerto Rico. In rain-stricken Haiti, heavy rainfall caused the Orangers River to overflow its banks, resulting in severe damage to homes in Jacmel. In the Northeastern United States, two people were killed by large waves in Rhode Island. Heavy rainfall across Massachusetts and Connecticut led to significant flooding. Kyle produced hurricane-force winds along the southwestern coastline of Nova Scotia that uprooted trees while damaging boats, docks, wharves, and a building under construction. More than 40,000 customers were left without electricity at the height of the storm. Coastal locales were inundated by a combination of storm surge, large waves, and high tides, particularly in Shelburne, where streets were flooded. Kyle and its remnants caused roughly $9 million in damage in Canada.

Tropical Storm Laura

On September 26, a non-tropical low formed along a quasi-stationary front well west of the Azores. This feature organized into Subtropical Storm Laura by 06:00 UTC on September 29 after shedding its frontal boundaries, and it further developed into a fully tropical system on September 30 as deep convection formed over the center. A northward motion brought the storm over progressively cooler waters on October 1, and it degenerated to a remnant area of low pressure by 12:00 UTC that day. The low merged with a front less than 24 hours later and existed as an extratropical entity until being absorbed by a larger non-tropical low west of the British Isles on October 4. The remnants of Laura produced heavy rainfall on already-saturated ground across the northwestern United Kingdom, overflowing drainage systems and closing roads. In eastern Norway, strong winds downed trees onto roadways and cut power to 10,000 households.

Tropical Storm Marco

A broad area of low pressure persisted across the northwestern Caribbean Sea through the end of September. A tropical wave reached the southwestern Caribbean on October 4, aiding in the formation of a circulation center near Belize. The low tracked across Yucatán Peninsula and, following an increase in convection while over the Laguna de Términos, organized into a tropical depression around 00:00 UTC on October 6. The newly formed cyclone entered the Bay of Campeche a few hours later and quickly intensified into a tropical storm—the smallest on record in the Atlantic Ocean. Favorable anticyclonic flow aloft aided in continued development of the tightly coiled storm, and Marco attained peak winds of  early on October 7, an intensity it maintained through landfall east of Misantla around 12:00 UTC that day. Marco's tiny circulation quickly weakened once inland, dissipating by 00:00 UTC on October 8. Impacts from the storm were generally minor, though some low-lying cities were flooded by heavy rainfall.

Tropical Storm Nana

A tropical wave exited the west coast of Africa on October 6, accompanied by a broad area of low pressure. The system organized as bands of convection coalesced around the center, leading to the formation of a tropical depression around 06:00 UTC on October 12. The effects of strong wind shear mitigated further organization, weakening the storm back to tropical depression intensity by 12:00 UTC on October 13 and causing it to degenerate to a remnant low a day later. The low turned northwest and dissipated on October 15.

Hurricane Omar

A tropical wave moved off Africa on September 30 and failed to organize appreciably until reaching the eastern Caribbean Sea on October 9. There, an increase in convection led to the formation of a tropical depression around 06:00 UTC on October 13; it intensified into Tropical Storm Omar eighteen hours later. A broad upper-level trough to the cyclone's northwest caused it to conduct a counter-clockwise turn and accelerate northeast while also aiding in the onset of an extended period of rapid intensification. Omar attained hurricane strength around 00:00 UTC on October 15 before ultimately reaching peak winds of  a little over a day later shortly after passing near Saint Croix. Uncharacteristically, the cyclone was plagued by moderate wind shear during its rapid intensification phase, and a further increase in upper-level winds caused Omar to abruptly weaken. The storm continued northeast through the Anegada Passage and into the central Atlantic. Omar weakened to a tropical storm around 00:00 UTC on October 18 and degenerating to a remnant low twelve hours later. The low persisted for two days before dissipating.

Omar first impacted the Netherlands Antilles, where large waves caused severe damage to coastal facilities. Winds just shy of tropical storm intensity damaged the roofs of homes and downed several trees. The island of Aruba saw significant flooding from heavy rains. Throughout the United States Virgin Islands, only the eastern sections of Saint Croix received hurricane-force winds, with tropical storm-force winds in surrounding locales. These strong winds nonetheless downed trees and power lines and capsized 94 vessels. Landslides damaged roadways. Overall damage was estimated around $5 million in Saint Croix. Across the Lesser Antilles, the combination of strong winds and frequent lightning caused widespread power outages. Ships were run aground, structures were damaged, and some communities were isolated. Storm surge was severe in western sections of Saint Vincent and the Grenadines, causing significant damage to coastal property and businesses. One man died in Puerto Rico after going into cardiac arrest while installing storm shutters. Total damage was estimated at $19 million in Saint Kitts and Nevis, $54 million in Antigua and Barbuda, and $2.6 million in Saint Lucia.

Tropical Depression Sixteen

A tropical wave left Africa on September 27 and moved into the southwestern Caribbean Sea on October 10, where a broad area of low pressure formed. The low paralleled the coastline of Nicaragua for a few days while associated convection became better organized; this ultimately led to the development of a tropical depression around 12:00 UTC on October 14. The storm maintained a poorly-organized structure throughout its duration, with the low-level center embedded within a larger gyre and little central thunderstorm activity. It moved west-southwest and ultimately degenerated over mountainous terrain around 06:00 UTC the next day. In mid- to late October, the tropical depression combined with another area of low pressure as well as a cold front to produce torrential rainfall across Central America. In what was described as the region's worst flooding disaster since Hurricane Mitch, crops suffered catastrophic losses, tens of thousands of homes were destroyed, and dozens of people were killed. At least nine deaths were directly attributed to the depression itself.

Hurricane Paloma

A broad area of disturbed weather developed in the southwestern Caribbean Sea on November 1, ultimately coalescing into a tropical depression around 18:00 UTC on November 5. It moved north amid a favorable environment, becoming Tropical Storm Paloma twelve hours after formation and attaining hurricane intensity by 00:00 UTC on November 7. An impinging upper-level trough directed Paloma toward the northeast while enhancing outflow, prompting a period of rapid intensification that brought the storm to its peak as a Category 4 hurricane with winds of  around 12:00 UTC on November 8, the third strongest November hurricane on record in the Atlantic. An increase in wind shear soon began to take a toll on the cyclone, weakening Paloma to Category 2 strength as it made landfall near Santa Cruz del Sur, Cuba, and further to a tropical storm around 06:00 UTC on November 9. It ultimately degenerated to a remnant low early the next day. The low meandered around Cuba before entering the Gulf of Mexico, and it dissipated south of the Florida Panhandle on November 14.

Paloma caused significant impacts on Cayman Brac in the Cayman Islands, where nearly every structure was damaged or destroyed. On nearby Little Cayman, a fewer number of buildings were destroyed while trees and power lines were downed. Damage across the island chain was estimated at $124.5 million. In Cuba, the combination of hurricane-force winds, torrential rainfall, and significant storm surge along the coastline resulted in damage to 12,159 homes; 1,453 of these were destroyed. Hundreds of businesses were impacted, dozens of electrical poles were toppled, and over a dozen bridges were damaged. The island's agricultural sector suffered significant loss. Overall, Paloma inflicted about $300 million in damage there. In Jamaica, rainfall contributed to one death. The storm's remnants moved northward into Florida, resulting in a daily rainfall record in Tallahassee and localized heavy rainfall in surrounding locales.

Storm names
The following list of names was used for named storms that formed in the North Atlantic in 2008. The names not retired from this list were used again in the 2014 season. This was the same list used in the 2002 season, with the exceptions of Ike and Laura, which replaced Isidore and Lili, respectively. The names Ike, Omar, and Paloma were used for the first (and only, in the cases of Ike and Paloma) time this year. The name Laura was previously used in 1971.

Retirement
On April 22, 2009, at the 31st Session of the RA IV Hurricane Committee, the World Meteorological Organization retired the names Gustav, Ike, and Paloma from its rotating name lists due to the number of deaths and damage they caused, and they will not be used again for another Atlantic hurricane. They were replaced with Gonzalo, Isaias, and Paulette for the 2014 season. Isaias and Paulette were not used until the 2020 season.

Season effects
This is a table of all of the storms that formed in the 2008 Atlantic hurricane season. It includes their duration, names, intensities, areas affected, damages, and death totals. Deaths in parentheses are additional and indirect (an example of an indirect death would be a traffic accident), but were still related to that storm. Damage and deaths include totals while the storm was extratropical, a wave, or a low, and all of the damage figures are in 2008 USD.

See also

 Lists of Atlantic hurricanes
 Atlantic hurricane season
 Tropical cyclones in 2008
 2008 Pacific hurricane season
 2008 Pacific typhoon season
 2008 North Indian Ocean cyclone season
 South-West Indian Ocean cyclone seasons: 2007–08, 2008–09
 Australian region cyclone seasons: 2007–08, 2008–09
 South Pacific cyclone seasons: 2007–08, 2008–09

Footnotes

References

External links
 Satellite movie of 2008 Atlantic hurricane season
 HPC rainfall page for 2008 Tropical Cyclones
 National Hurricane Center Website
 National Hurricane Center's Atlantic Tropical Weather Outlook

 
Atlantic hurricane seasons
Articles which contain graphical timelines
2008 Atl